Ronald George Wreyford Norrish FRS (9 November 1897 – 7 June 1978) was a British chemist who was awarded the Nobel Prize in Chemistry in 1967.

Education and early life
Norrish was born in Cambridge and was educated at The Perse School and Emmanuel College, Cambridge. He was a former student of Eric Rideal. From an early age he was interested in chemistry, walking up and down Cambridge University chemical laboratory admiring all the equipment. His father encouraged him to construct and equip a small laboratory in his garden shed in his garden and supplied all the chemicals he needed to conduct experiments. This apparatus now forms part of the Science Museum collections - reference shows copper water tank  He used to enter competitions for the analysis of mixtures sent round by the Pharmaceutical Journal and often won prizes. In 1915 Norrish won a Foundation Scholarship to Emmanuel College, but by adding a little to his age joined the Royal Field Artillery and served as a Lieutenant, first in Ireland and then on the Western Front.

Career and research
Norrish was a prisoner in World War I and later commented, with sadness, that many of his contemporaries and potential competitors at Cambridge had not survived the War. Military records show that 2nd Lieutenant Norrish of the Royal Artillery went missing (captured) on 21 March 1918.
 
Norrish rejoined Emmanuel College as a Research Fellow in 1925 and later became Head of the Department of Physical Chemistry at the University of Cambridge. For many years, the Department of Physical Chemistry occupied the left-hand side of the Lensfield Road building with the other (and separate) department of 'Chemistry' (which encompassed organic, theoretical and inorganic chemistry) led by (Lord) Alexander R. Todd being accessed by turning right at the main entrance. Both departments had separate administrative, technical and academic personnel until they merged to form one chemistry department under John Meurig Thomas in the early 1980s. Norrish researched photochemistry using continuous light sources (including after the war, searchlights).

The skill which Norrish displayed in his laboratory work problems marked him out amongst his contemporaries as an unusually gifted and energetic experimentalist, capable of making significant advances in photo-chemistry and gas kinetics.

Awards and honours
Norrish was elected a Fellow of the Royal Society (FRS) in 1936. As a result of the development of flash photolysis, Norrish was awarded the Nobel Prize in Chemistry in 1967 along with Manfred Eigen and George Porter for their study of extremely fast chemical reactions. One of his accomplishments is the development of the Norrish reaction.

At Cambridge, Norrish supervised Rosalind Franklin, future DNA researcher and colleague of James Watson and Francis Crick, and experienced some conflict with her.

References

External links
  including the Nobel Lecture, December 11, 1967 Some Fast Reactions in Gases Studied by Flash Photolysis and Kinetic Spectroscopy

1897 births
1978 deaths
People from Cambridge
People educated at The Perse School
Alumni of Emmanuel College, Cambridge
Fellows of Emmanuel College, Cambridge
Nobel laureates in Chemistry
British Nobel laureates
English physical chemists
World War I prisoners of war held by Germany
Faraday Lecturers
Fellows of the Royal Society
English Nobel laureates
British World War I prisoners of war
Professors of Physical Chemistry (Cambridge)